Kuala Lumpur Golf & Country Club (KLGCC), formerly known as Tournament Players Club or TPC Kuala Lumpur, is a golf club located in Mont Kiara. Many of its facilities are open to visitors, including the golf course, driving range, all six F&B venues, bowling centre, Let's Get Fit workout classes, proshop and golf academy.

The club became part of the TPC network of golf courses on 24 August 2016. The inauguration was graced by Her Majesty, Tuanku Hajah Haminah Hamidun and accompanied by the then Deputy Commissioner of PGA TOUR, Jay Monahan.

The club adheres to the standards set by the PGA TOUR, LPGA and TPC Network of golf clubs.

Golf Courses 
Originally opened in 1991, TPC Kuala Lumpur's two 18-hole championship golf courses, the Par 71 East and Par 72 West Courses had since undergone a total redesign. The revamped West Course reopened in 2009 and the East Course in 2010.
TPC Kuala Lumpur's West Course completed another upgrade in August 2018. By end of 2018, seven Malaysian Opens and five CIMB Classic tournaments were held on TPC Kuala Lumpur's West Course.

International tournaments 
TPC Kuala Lumpur has hosted several international championships, including the Sime Darby LPGA Malaysia on its East Course, and the CIMB Classic and Maybank Malaysian Open on the West Course. TPC Kuala Lumpur also played host for two women's international tennis tournaments: the 2016 BMW Malaysian Open and the 2017 ALYA WTA Malaysian Open.

Awards and recognition 
In addition, KLGCC has won numerous awards at the Asian Golf Awards over the years including the highest honour in the forms of the Order of the Zenith and the Legion of Leaders awards.

References

External links

Golf clubs and courses in Malaysia
Sports venues in Kuala Lumpur